Leah Litman (born December 13, 1984) is an assistant professor of law at the University of Michigan Law School. Litman is a co-host of the podcast Strict Scrutiny, a podcast about the Supreme Court of the United States alongside Melissa Murray and Kate A. Shaw.

Education 

Litman earned her Bachelor of Arts in Chemistry & Chemical Biology at Harvard College in 2006 and her Juris Doctor summa cum laude at the University of Michigan Law School in 2010. While in law school, she was editor-in-chief of the Michigan Law Review and won the Henry M. Bates Memorial Scholarship Award.

Career 

Litman became a Research Associate at Bancroft Associates PLLC in 2006. She was a law clerk to Judge Jeffrey Sutton on the Sixth Circuit from 2010 to 2011 and then for Justice Anthony Kennedy on the Supreme Court of the United States from 2011 - 2012.

Litman became an Associate at WilmerHale in 2012. She then became a Climenko Fellow at Harvard Law School in 2014. She became an assistant professor of law at University of California, Irvine School of Law in 2016, teaching constitutional law, post-conviction review/habeas corpus, and federal courts. In 2019, Litman joined the University of Michigan Law School first as an assistant professor of Law and then as a professor of law in 2022. In 2021, Litman was awarded the L. Hart Wright Teaching Award from Michigan Law students. Litman also was a visiting assistant professor in the Supreme Court Litigation Clinic at Stanford Law School. In 2023, Litman received the Ruth Bader Ginsburg Scholar Award from the American Constitution Society.

Media commentary

Litman has co-hosted the podcast Strict Scrutiny, along with fellow legal academics Kate A. Shaw and Melissa Murray, since 2019. The podcast analyzes and critiques recent Supreme Court cases, providing historical context and political commentary on the likely impacts of the Court's decisions.

Notable cases 

In 2016, Litman was part of the litigation team in Whole Woman's Health v. Hellerstedt. The case was decided in the US Supreme Court in a 5–3 ruling. The opinion stated Texas cannot place restrictions on the delivery of abortion services that create an undue burden for women seeking an abortion.

In 2019, Litman was part of the litigation team in Hernandez v. Mesa. The case centered on the 2010 shooting of Sergio Hernández Guereca, an unarmed Mexican national teenager on the Mexican side of the Mexico–United States border. He was shot and killed by United States Border Patrol Agent Jesus Mesa, who was patrolling the border by bicycle.

In 2022, Litman was part of the litigation team in Garcia v. United States. The lawsuit successfully challenged the rescission of the DACA program.

References

1984 births
Living people
Harvard College alumni
University of Michigan Law School alumni
American women legal scholars
University of Michigan Law School faculty